Communist Party of Indiana v. Whitcomb, 414 U.S. 441 (1974), was a United States Supreme Court case based on the First Amendment to the U.S. Constitution that invalidated Indiana's loyalty oath requirement.

Summary
The state of Indiana, for the 1972 election, required nominees to submit a sworn oath stating that their party "does not advocate the overthrow of local, state or national government by force or violence."  The Communist Party of Indiana refused to submit such a declaration, and as a result Indiana refused to put their candidates on the ballot.  The Communist Party appealed to the Supreme Court.

In a unanimous verdict, the Supreme Court held in favor of the Communist Party. The majority opinion, authored by Justice William J. Brennan, Jr. and joined by four other Justices, stated that "a group advocating violent overthrow as abstract doctrine need not be regarded as necessarily advocating unlawful action."   The court also held that "the principle that the constitutional guarantees of free speech and free press do not permit a State to forbid or proscribe advocacy of the use of force or of law violation except where such advocacy is directed to inciting or producing imminent lawless action and is likely to produce such action."

Justice Lewis F. Powell, Jr. wrote a short opinion concurring in the judgment, joined by three other Justices. In his view, there is no need to decide the free speech question. Instead, he concluded that as the Indiana officials did not apply the loyalty oath requirement to the Democratic Party and the Republican Party, their discriminatory application of the requirement to the Communist Party violated the Equal Protection Clause of the Fourteenth Amendment.

See also
List of United States Supreme Court cases involving the First Amendment
List of United States Supreme Court cases, volume 414

External links
 
 

1974 in United States case law
American Civil Liberties Union litigation
United States Supreme Court cases
United States Supreme Court cases of the Burger Court
Communist Party USA litigation